Martin Stirling Gullan (5 October 1876 – 1 August 1939) was an Australian rules footballer who played with South Melbourne in the Victorian Football League (VFL).

Notes

External links 

1876 births
1939 deaths
Australian rules footballers from Victoria (Australia)
Sydney Swans players
Ballarat Football Club players